Jesse Proudman is a Seattle-based entrepreneur. He founded Blue Box, which provided private cloud as a service based on OpenStack technology. The company was sold to IBM in 2015. In 2018, after leaving IBM, he founded Strix Leviathan, which is building an investment management platform for crypto currencies.

References 

Living people
Year of birth missing (living people)